Grand River Township is a township in Madison County, Iowa, in the United States.

History
Grand River Township was organized in 1858. Its namesake, the Grand River, its principal stream.

References

Townships in Madison County, Iowa
Townships in Iowa
1858 establishments in Iowa